Jackdaw with Crowbar is an English multi-media indie band from Leamington Spa. The band was formed in 1985, but consolidated in 1987, when signed to Ron Johnson Records, until it went bust.

History
Jackdaw with Crowbar's original line-up was Timothy Ellis, Fergus Durrant, Dave Tibbats and Dan Morrison, with Adam Sindall, Steve Law and Fran Juckes making Super 8mm films which were always present in their live performances. This line-up released the band's first three records, Monarchy, Mayhem and Fishpaste, Sink Sank Sunk and Hot Air.

The band contributed to the 1988 compilation album Take Five in aid of the charity Shelter.

In 1991, Jackdaw released Hanging In the Balance, expanding the line-up with Tris King (formerly of Bogshed and later of A Witness), Andy Guthrie, Alan McCulloch (aka "Wak"), Andy Grimmer, Wilf Plum (Dog Faced Hermans) and Charley 'H' Bembridge (The Selecter).

Jackdaw had two John Peel sessions on 19 May 1987 and 4 October 1987. Jackdaw stopped touring around 1991 or 1992. In 2005, "Fuck America" was released on a compilation CD, Commercially Unfriendly: The Best Of British Underground, on Gott Discs. In 2007, Ellis and Sindall started working together and Jackdaw was re-hatched with Fergus Durrant joining soon after. With all new films and songs, Jackdaw released a new EP available from Hybrid Cuts. The 8mm films were replaced by lap tops and video projectors. Jackdaw received air play on BBC Radio 6 in Stuart Maconie's Freak Zone and Don Letts' show.

Jackdaw with Crowbar, in 2018, entered into its third age continuing as a duo, known as Jackdaw with Crowbar, Because You're Worth It, with Ellis and Sindall.

Musical style
The band's musical style was described by the musician and writer John Robb as a combination of "spiky and dark guitar-driven blues and guitar-punk disco-filth". Discussing the first EP, Monarchy, Mayhem, and Fishpaste, the writer John Corbett described the music as "a song sung through a bull horn ("Crow"), an accordion reggae-dub ("Fourth World"), a two-step featuring slide guitar reminiscent of Zoot Horn Rollo in Captain Beefheart's Magic Band ("The Night Albania Fell on Alabama")." In Corbett's view, "the brief appearance of Jackdaw's records exemplifies the local-mode commodity at both its most appealing and its most politically volatile".

Discography

References

External links
 

English indie rock groups
Musical groups established in 1986
1986 establishments in England